Alison Dozzo (born 7 March 1968) is a Canadian former swimmer. She competed in the women's 200 metre individual medley at the 1984 Summer Olympics.

References

External links
 

1968 births
Living people
Olympic swimmers of Canada
Swimmers at the 1984 Summer Olympics
Swimmers from Toronto
Canadian female medley swimmers
20th-century Canadian women
21st-century Canadian women